Cochrane station could refer to the following:

 Cochrane MRT station, a rapid transit station in Kuala Lumpur, Malaysia
 Cochrane station (Ontario), a railway station in Cochrane, Ontario, Canada
 Cochrane railway station, Sydney, a disused railway station in Sydney, New South Wales, Australia